Lauren Pfeiffer (born 1987) is a former field hockey defender who represented the United States in international competition.

Pfeiffer was raised in Mount Laurel, New Jersey and attended Lenape High School. She picked up her interest in field hockey from her mother, who had competed interscholastically at Rowan University.

Pfeiffer graduated from the University of Iowa in 2009, where she played for the Hawkeyes. Pfeiffer scored 53 goals in her career and was a part of three Big Ten championships and was part of the team that made it to the NCAA Final Four in 2008.

References 

1987 births
Living people
American female field hockey players
Iowa Hawkeyes field hockey players
Lenape High School alumni
People from Mount Laurel, New Jersey
Sportspeople from Burlington County, New Jersey
University of Iowa alumni